In enzymology, a D-arabinitol 2-dehydrogenase is an enzyme that catalyzes the chemical reaction

D-arabinitol + NAD+  D-ribulose + NADH + H+

Thus, the two substrates of this enzyme are D-arabinitol and NAD+, whereas its 3 products are D-ribulose, NADH, and H+.

This enzyme belongs to the family of oxidoreductases, specifically those acting on the CH-OH group of donor with NAD+ or NADP+ as acceptor. The systematic name of this enzyme class is D-arabinitol:NAD+ 2-oxidoreductase (D-ribulose-forming). This enzyme is also called D-arabinitol 2-dehydrogenase (ribulose-forming).

References

 
 

EC 1.1.1
NADH-dependent enzymes
Enzymes of unknown structure